Zdenka Horešová (born 13 August 1993) is a Slovak footballer who plays as a midfielder. She has been a member of the Slovakia women's national team.

International career
Horešová capped for Slovakia at senior level during the UEFA Women's Euro 2017 qualifying Group 4, including a 2–1 home win against Poland on 12 April 2016.

References

1993 births
Living people
Women's association football midfielders
Slovak women's footballers
Slovakia women's international footballers